Run Like a Thief (Spanish: Robo de diamantes) is a 1967 American-Spanish comedy crime film directed by Bernard Glasser and starring Kieron Moore, Ina Balin and Keenan Wynn. A soldier of fortune makes off with a fortune in diamonds, but has to go to great lengths to evade his pursuers.

The film's sets were designed by the art director Santiago Ontañón. Location shooting took place in Spain at Madrid and Guadalajara

Plot

Cast
 Kieron Moore as Johnny Dent 
 Ina Balin as Mona Shannon 
 Keenan Wynn as Willy Gore 
 Fernando Rey as Col. Romero 
 Charles Regnier as Piet de Jonge 
 Victor Maddern as Abel Baker 
 Sancho Gracia as Wes 
 Bobby Hall as Whitey Keller 
 Mike Brendel as Turk 
 Luis Rivera as Young Lieutenant 
 Román Ariznavarreta as Ernie 
 Joe Zboran as Benny 
 Xan das Bolas as Gonzalez 
 Vicente Roca as Shipping Clerk 
 Jerzy Radlowsky as Bert 
 Charles Siegmund as Carl 
 Pedro Barbero as Peters 
 Scott Miller as Rolf

References

Bibliography
 Esteve Riambau & Casimiro Torreiro. Productores en el cine español: estado, dependencias y mercado. Cátedra, 2008.

External links

1967 films
Spanish crime comedy films
1960s crime comedy films
American crime comedy films
English-language Spanish films
Films shot in Spain
1960s English-language films
1960s American films